The Pärnu Sports Hall is a multi-purpose indoor arena complex in Pärnu. The hall was opened in 2009 and is the current home arena of the Korvpalli Meistriliiga team BC Pärnu and the Baltic Volleyball League team Pärnu VK.

References

External links
 Official website 

Sports venues in Estonia
Basketball venues in Estonia
Indoor arenas in Estonia
Buildings and structures in Pärnu
Volleyball venues in Estonia
2009 establishments in Estonia
Sports venues completed in 2009
Sport in Pärnu